In geometry, a 6-simplex is a self-dual regular 6-polytope. It has 7 vertices, 21 edges, 35 triangle faces, 35 tetrahedral cells,  21 5-cell 4-faces, and 7 5-simplex 5-faces. Its dihedral angle is cos−1(1/6), or approximately 80.41°.

Alternate names 

It can also be called a heptapeton, or hepta-6-tope, as a 7-facetted polytope in 6-dimensions. The name heptapeton is derived from hepta for seven facets in Greek and -peta for having five-dimensional facets, and -on. Jonathan Bowers gives a heptapeton the acronym hop.

As a configuration
This configuration matrix represents the 6-simplex. The rows and columns correspond to vertices, edges, faces, cells, 4-faces and 5-faces. The diagonal numbers say how many of each element occur in the whole 6-simplex. The nondiagonal numbers say how many of the column's element occur in or at the row's element. This self-dual simplex's matrix is identical to its 180 degree rotation.

Coordinates 

The Cartesian coordinates for an origin-centered regular heptapeton having edge length 2 are:

The vertices of the 6-simplex can be more simply positioned in 7-space as permutations of:
 (0,0,0,0,0,0,1)

This construction is based on facets of the 7-orthoplex.

Images

Related uniform 6-polytopes 
The regular 6-simplex is one of 35 uniform 6-polytopes based on the [3,3,3,3,3] Coxeter group, all shown here in A6 Coxeter plane orthographic projections.

Notes

References
 Coxeter, H.S.M.: 
 
 
 (Paper 22) 
 (Paper 23) 
 (Paper 24)

External links 

 Polytopes of Various Dimensions
 Multi-dimensional Glossary

6-polytopes